Malliswari is a 2004 Indian Telugu-language romantic comedy film directed by K. Vijaya Bhaskar who co-wrote the film with Trivikram Srinivas. It is produced by D. Suresh Babu on Suresh Productions banner. The film stars Venkatesh and Katrina Kaif (in her Telugu debut) and music composed by Koti. The film was a commercial success.

Plot 
Malliswari is the heiress of Raja of Mirzapur. Her deceased father wrote in his will that she would inherit the property worth  after she becomes major at the age of 21. The entire property is under the control of Bhavani Shankar, who wants to inherit the entire property by killing her. As he hatches the plans to eliminate Malliswari, she is sent to her uncle's in Visakhapatnam as a normal girl so that she can live with anonymity. Prasad works as a bank accountant in Andhra Bank there. He is a bachelor who has been continuously seeking for marriage alliance for the past seven years, and is growing increasingly desperate. He accidentally meets Malliswari and falls deeply in love with her. Malliswari is traced by the goons there and they start running after her. Prasad escorts her and drops her safely in Hyderabad. The rest of the story describes what happens next and the eventual conclusion of the plot.

Cast

 Venkatesh as Tathineni Veera Venkata Vara Prasad aka Pellikani Prasad, an unmarried bank employee
 Katrina Kaif as Malliswari, Princess of Mirzapuram who disguises as a maid
 Kota Srinivasa Rao as Bhavani Shankar
 Brahmanandam as Balu
 Sunil as Padmanabham "Paddu"
 Naresh as Prasad's elder brother
 Tanikella Bharani as Murthy
 M. S. Narayana as Krishnaveni's husband (Cameo)
 Dharmavarapu Subrahmanyam as Bank Manager Shankar Rao
 Mallikarjuna Rao as Prasad's paternal uncle
 M. Balaiah as Ram Mohan Rao (Malliswari's grandfather)
 Ahuti Prasad as Malliswari's paternal uncle
 Chalapati Rao as Raghav Rao
 Banerjee as an assassin to kill Malliswari
 Raghunatha Reddy as Police Officer
 C. V. L Narasimha Rao as Lawyer
 Devadas Kanakala as Lawyer
 Prabhu as Bobby (Bhavani Shankar's son)
 Chittajalu Lakshmipati as Ice Cream vendor
 Chitram Seenu as Peon Seenu
 Sarika Ramachandra Rao as Auto Driver
 Gundu Sudarshan as Marriage Broker
 Gautam Raju as Cashier Subba Rao
 Chitti Babu as Vegetable Vendor
 Bandla Ganesh as Drunker 
 Smita as an assassin to kill Malliswari
 Hema as Krishnaveni
 Rajya Lakshmi as Prasad's sister-in-law
 Rajitha as Murthy's wife
 Shanoor Sana as Malliswari's paternal aunty
 Uma as Lakshmi
 Padma Jayanth as Bhavani Shankar's wife
 Priyanka
 Master Rohit as Siddharth (boy in the library)
 Baby Greeshma as Dolly
 Gajala as Monalisa (Cameo)

Production 

K. Vijaya Bhaskar scripted the film form an original story given by Trivikram Srinivas, who also provided the dialogue. The film was reportedly inspired by the 1953 film Roman Holiday. Cinematography and editing are performed by Sameer Reddy and A. Sreekar Prasad respectively.

Kaif was paid 70 lakhs for her role in the film, thereby becoming the highest paid South Indian actress at the time.

Soundtrack

The music was composed by Koti. The song "Gundello Gulabila Mullu" is based on Rhythm Divine. The music was released on Aditya Music. All songs sung by eminent singers like S. P. Balasubrahmanyam, K. S. Chithra, Shankar Mahadevan, Shreya Ghoshal, Kumar Sanu, KK etc.

Release 
The film was released on 18 February 2004.

Awards
Nandi Awards
Best Home Viewing Feature Film - D. Suresh Babu
Best Dialogue Writer - Trivikram Srinivas

References

External links
 

2004 films
2000s Telugu-language films
Indian romantic comedy films
Films scored by Koti
Films directed by K. Vijaya Bhaskar
2004 romantic comedy films
Films set in Andhra Pradesh
Films shot in Andhra Pradesh
Films set in Visakhapatnam
Films shot in Visakhapatnam
Suresh Productions films